Josh Aubrey (born April 9, 1991) is a former American football safety of the National Football League (NFL). He was signed as an undrafted free agent by the Cleveland Browns. He also played for the Seattle Seahawks, Houston Texans, and Tennessee Titans. He played college football at Stephen F. Austin State University.

Early years
He was selected to the all-district team twice in high school. He earned TSWA all-state honors and All-East Texas.

Professional career

Cleveland Browns
On April 30, 2013, he signed with the Cleveland Browns as an undrafted free agent following the 2013 NFL Draft.

References

External links
Stephen F. Austin bio
Cleveland Browns bio

Living people
1991 births
American football cornerbacks
Cleveland Browns players
Houston Texans players
Seattle Seahawks players
Tennessee Titans players
Stephen F. Austin Lumberjacks football players
People from Terrell, Texas
Players of American football from Texas